Silver Wheel of Prayer is the fifth album by guitarist and composer Roy Montgomery, released on 13 February 2001 through VHF Records.

Track listing

Personnel 
Arnold Van Bussell – engineering
Roy Montgomery – guitar, EBow, organ, mixing

References 

2001 albums
Roy Montgomery albums
VHF Records albums